The Works of Aristotle, sometimes referred to by modern scholars as the Corpus Aristotelicum, is the collection of Aristotle's works that have survived from antiquity.

Diogenes Laërtius lists in his Lives and Opinions of Eminent Philosophers the works of Aristotle comprising 156 titles divided into approximately 400 books, which he reports as totaling 445,270 lines of writing,  however many of these are lost or only survive in fragments.

According to a distinction that originates with Aristotle himself, his writings are divisible into two groups: the "exoteric" and the "esoteric". Most scholars have understood this as a distinction between works Aristotle intended for the public (exoteric), and the more technical works intended for use within the Lyceum course / school (esoteric). Modern scholars commonly assume these latter to be Aristotle's own (unpolished) lecture notes (or in some cases possible notes by his students). However, one classic scholar offers an alternative interpretation. The 5th century neoplatonist Ammonius Hermiae writes that Aristotle's writing style is deliberately obscurantist so that "good people may for that reason stretch their mind even more, whereas empty minds that are lost through carelessness will be put to flight by the obscurity when they encounter sentences like these."

Not all of these works are considered genuine, but differ with respect to their connection to Aristotle, his associates and his views. Some are regarded by most scholars as products of Aristotle's "school" and compiled under his direction or supervision. Other works, such as On Colors, may have been products of Aristotle's successors at the Lyceum, e.g., Theophrastus and Strato of Lampsacus. Still others acquired Aristotle's name through similarities in doctrine or content, such as the De Plantis, possibly by Nicolaus of Damascus. A final category, omitted here, includes medieval palmistries, astrological and magical texts whose connection to Aristotle is purely fanciful and self-promotional.

In several of the treatises, there are references to other works in the corpus.  Based on such references, some scholars have suggested a possible chronological order for a number of Aristotle's writings. W.D. Ross, for instance, suggested the following broad chronology (which of course leaves out much):  Categories, Topics, Sophistici Elenchi, Analytics, Metaphysics Δ, the physical works, the Ethics, and the rest of the Metaphysics.  Many modern scholars however, based simply on lack of evidence, are skeptical of such attempts to determine the chronological order of Aristotle's writings.

Aristotle's works by Bekker numbers 

Bekker numbers, the standard form of reference to works in the Corpus Aristotelicum, are based on the page numbers used in the Prussian Academy of Sciences edition of the complete works of Aristotle (Aristotelis Opera edidit Academia Regia Borussica, Berlin, 1831–1870).  They take their name from the editor of that edition, the classical philologist August Immanuel Bekker (1785–1871).

Fragments
Surviving fragments of the many lost works of Aristotle were included in the fifth volume of Bekker's edition, edited by Valentin Rose.  These are not cited by Bekker numbers, however, but according to fragment numbers. Rose's first edition of the fragments of Aristotle was Aristoteles Pseudepigraphus (1863).  As the title suggests, Rose considered these all to be spurious. The numeration of the fragments in a revised edition by Rose, published in the Teubner series, Aristotelis qui ferebantur librorum fragmenta, Leipzig, 1886, is still commonly used (indicated by R3), although there is a more current edition with a different numeration by Olof Gigon (published in 1987 as a new vol. 3 in Walter de Gruyter's reprint of the Bekker edition), and a new de Gruyter edition by Eckart Schütrumpf is in preparation.

For a selection of the fragments in English translation, see W. D. Ross, Select Fragments (Oxford 1952), and Jonathan Barnes (ed.), The Complete Works of Aristotle: The Revised Oxford Translation, vol. 2, Princeton 1984, pp. 2384–2465. A new translation exists of the fragments of Aristotle's Protrepticus, by Hutchinson and Johnson (2015).

The works surviving only in fragments include the dialogues On Philosophy (or On the Good), Eudemus (or On the Soul), On Justice, and On Good Birth.  The possibly spurious work, On Ideas survives in quotations by Alexander of Aphrodisias in his commentary on Aristotle's Metaphysics.  For the dialogues, see also the editions of Richard Rudolf Walzer, Aristotelis Dialogorum fragmenta, in usum scholarum (Florence 1934), and Renato Laurenti, Aristotele: I frammenti dei dialoghi (2 vols.), Naples: Luigi Loffredo, 1987.

Notes

Sources 
 Works cited

External links 

 The Ancient Catalogues of Aristotle's Writings. A Survey of Current Research
 The Rediscovery of the Corpus Aristotelicum with an annotated bibliography
 Bekker's Prussian Academy of Sciences edition of the complete works of Aristotle at Archive.org
 
 Lazaris, S. "L’image paradigmatique: des 'Schémas anatomiques' d’Aristote au 'De materia medica' de Dioscoride", Pallas, 93 (2013), p. 131-164 ext. link
 Oxford Translation of The Works of Aristotle at Archive.org (contents by volume)
 

 
Philosophy books
4th-century BC books
Aristotle